Diabolocatantops axillaris is a grasshopper species in the subfamily Catantopinae and tribe Catantopini. It is found in Africa. It is a pest of the pearl millet in the West African Sahel, including in Mali.

Gallery

References

External links 
 
 
 Names in Dogon languages, with images from Mali

Catantopinae
Orthoptera of Africa
Agricultural pest insects
Insect pests of millets